Marc Dalton  is a Canadian politician. He is the current Conservative Member of Parliament for Pitt Meadows—Maple Ridge after the 2019 Canadian federal election. He was a BC Liberal Member of the Legislative Assembly of British Columbia following the 2009 and 2013 provincial elections for the riding of Maple Ridge-Mission.

Biography
Dalton ran as a Conservative candidate in Burnaby—New Westminster in the 2006 federal election, losing to incumbent MP Peter Julian. His nomination in the 2008 federal election in the Burnaby - New Westminster riding was refused by the Conservative Party of Canada.

Before his time in elected office, Dalton worked as a teacher in School District 42 Maple Ridge-Pitt Meadows at the elementary and high school levels. He caused much ire among fellow staff when he crossed union picket lines in 2005, midway through the BC teachers' strike. Dalton was quoted as saying, "Whether or not I agreed with the [B.C.] government, they had a legal mandate to rule and make decisions," he said. "It boiled down to obeying the law." Due to his service as a BC teacher, he is entitled to participate in the BC Teachers Plan and receive an estimated $30,825.

In Dalton's first term as MLA, he served as parliamentary secretary for independent schools, a position created by former British Columbia Premier Christy Clark in 2012. Having been a retired public school teacher for School District 42 Maple Ridge-Pitt Meadows, he had this to say on the appointment. "I think this position of parliamentary secretary is a reflection of the emphasis the government places on family choice -- choice of education,” On the privatization of school system's in British Columbia, Dalton further added more than 11 per cent of the student population is enrolled in independent schools, and because tuition fees are paid by parents, the education ministry saves money.

Dalton was on the Experience the Fraser steering committee, a trails and tourism project.

In 2012, Dalton campaigned to have the BC Liberals' name changed as he felt it was confusing for voters who may not know it is a centre-right party. “There is still a lot of confusion with name brand. People who are federal Conservatives, such as myself, they just have a hard time voting (BC) Liberal," Dalton said, adding his party needs to get out the message that a vote for the BC Conservatives is not a vote for the federal Conservative Party.

In February 2015, Dalton unsuccessfully ran for the federal Conservative nomination of Pitt Meadows—Maple Ridge, sitting as an independent MLA in the interim. Dalton rejoined the BC Liberals after the nomination serving as a backbench MLA until 2017 when he lost to British Columbia New Democratic Party challenger Bob D'Eith. Upon his loss as incumbent, Dalton was eligible to receive $132,000 in severance over 15-months with the British Columbia provincial legislature. It was revealed by former BC cabinet minister Bill Bennett that most eligible MLA's (including Dalton) took advantage of these payments for the full period. An additional $9,000 was also permitted for job-skills retraining. Due to serving two full terms in office, Dalton was granted a British Columbia MLA estimated pension of $32,600 ($563,772 payout by the age of 80). In 2019, he ran a third time for the federal Conservatives and won. As Member of Parliament serving the constituency of Pitt Meadows - Maple Ridge, he now holds a base salary of $185,800. If successful in the 44th Canadian Federal Election, Dalton will be eligible to attain a minimum $32,000 pension from the Parliament of Canada at age 65.

Controversies
While running in the 2009 British Columbia general election, an email written to a colleague from 1996 while Dalton was a schoolteacher was released by the NDP due to "disturbingly homophobic comments", according to MLA Spencer Herbert. The email was a response to concerns over overreach in proposed policy changes to address bullying in which Dalton wrote:

"I am not against homosexuals as people, but I do not support their lifestyle choices. I believe homosexuality is a moral issue. Most of us agree on many morals: respect, honesty, kindness.”

Dalton released an apology, stating he didn't intend to be offensive or hurtful.

In 2014, Dalton came under fire for his comments on child poverty as MLA. While debating the topic in the B.C. Legislature, then British Columbia New Democratic Party Social Development critic Michelle Mungall says, "One MLA flat out [Dalton] said he didn't know any children who were homeless, that there were no children who were homeless and no children were going hungry at a time when child food bank clients have increased by 30-percent.” In the legislature, Dalton said, “I have not met children starving in British Columbia in the past 50-some years. If they were, then I think that would be, normally, willful or criminal negligence."

During that year, Dalton voted against an amendment to the Vital Statistics Act that would allow transgender or gender non-binary individuals to change registered sex designation from their sex assigned at birth to reflect their gender identity. Maple Ridge based Thomas Haney Secondary school teacher and staff liaison for the gay-straight alliance, Kathryn Ferguson, condemned his decision stating, "Thank you, Mr. Dalton, for reminding me why we do need gay-straight alliance groups in the public school system,” Ferguson further added, "I wish we didn’t have a need for these groups, but when you have a MLA making these ignorant statements, it puts fire underneath us to keep going – because we’re still needed.”

On January 3, 2020, as Member of Parliament for Pitt Meadows - Maple Ridge, Dalton retweeted an opinion column from The Washington Examiner on Twitter titled, "The transgender movement’s message for girls: Your privacy concerns are bigotry" The article, written by freelancer Bethany Mandel alleges, "Young women know their bathrooms and locker rooms have become unsafe, but they are told to be quiet because the feelings of biological males and transgender students matter more," Dalton defended his re-posting of the article stating he's not pushing the issue aggressively, but spoke about it previously when he was MLA. “It’s concerning for women and for children and young girls to be in a place where there’s someone undressing right in front of them … with male genitalia. I think … it has to work for everybody,” Dalton said.

In his capacity as Member of Parliament for Pitt Meadows - Maple Ridge, Dalton crafted a tweet met with controversy during the COVID-19 pandemic in Canada on April 13, 2020. In his post, Dalton stated regarding seniors, "Most deaths are in care homes where average life expectancy is 2 yrs & 65% usually pass in the 1st yr. Time to start moving Canada back to work?" The post was removed after being up for several minutes. When questioned about the incident by media organizations, Dalton's office responded with the following, "Our thoughts and prayers are with the hundreds of Canadians who have lost loved ones because of COVID-19. I personally have an uncle in a care home who I love dearly who has contracted coronavirus."

Recall campaigns
Over Dalton's tenure as MLA for Maple Ridge - Mission, there had been two campaigns to recall and "fire" the politician from office. In 2011, the group Maple Ridge FightHST, led by Wilf McIntyre and Corisa Bell, launched the first push garnering roughly 2500 signatures, short of the 14,882 or 40% of required voters to begin the recall process. Dalton attempted to undermine the process, claiming locals thought they were signing a petition to halt the passage of the Harmonized Sales Tax in BC. Then, campaign organizer Wilf McIntyre said the group could have collected enough names to oust Dalton. In defense of the petition, McIntyre claimed, “We were very specific because we had to be.”

Four years later, Dalton faced a second recall attempt in 2015. The campaign began shortly after he decided to take a failed second run for a federal seat with the Conservative Party of Canada and sit as an independent MLA. Organizer Yvonne Hale said regarding the representatives run, “I think that goes to show that he's [Dalton] more focused on himself than his constituents." The call to remove Dalton from office ended up stalling following allegations of interference from his supporters and the B.C. Liberal Party. Recall spokesperson Jennifer Heighton says interruptions began at the Maple Ridge Home Show, where people with "Marc Dalton observer" name tags would argue and scare off potential signers from their booth. Heighton further claims that harassment also took place at Maple Ridge's downtown Haney Farmer's Market and other City locations where they would discourage the public from signing the petition. Heighton and the group called for an investigation by Elections B.C. regarding the matter: “Regardless of the Maple Ridge recall withdrawal, it is critically important that the legislation be respected and the right of democratic dissent be upheld. That’s why we want Elections B.C. to fully investigate this situation.” However, according to Elections B.C., the actions of the observers didn't contain any threats of violence, so they don't contravene Sec. 157 of the recall act, and the act also doesn't regulate the actions of observers. Dalton defended the use of observers and scrutineers, claiming they are not mentioned in the recall act, there's nothing that prohibits them. "They were being watched and being respectful... if they did talk to voters, it would have happened very infrequently." Jillian Stead, spokesperson for the B.C. Liberal Party, said the observers "were asked only to monitor the proponent's behaviour to ensure they were being honest in their solicitations, and to interfere only to correct misinformation." She said under Sec.157 of the Recall and Initiative Act, no one can interfere with someone's right to sign a petition and the observers took that seriously. This recall campaign only drew less than 10 percent of the required 15,410.

Political views
On June 22, 2021, Dalton along with 61 other Conservative caucus members and one independent voted against Bill C-6, An Act to amend the Criminal Code (conversion therapy). This bill, if fully passed, would criminalize the act conducting conversion therapy on LGBTQ2+ individuals, even if they have consented to it. In the same session, Dalton voted against Bill C-12, An Act respecting transparency and accountability in Canada's efforts to achieve net-zero greenhouse gas emissions by the year 2050. Dalton voted against the bill on the Conservative line, despite having a history of semi-support for environmental policy, including the introduction of a carbon tax in British Columbia when he served as MLA for Maple Ridge - Mission.

Dalton opposed Bill C-15, An Act respecting the United Nations Declaration on the Rights of Indigenous Peoples.  This Bill made the United Nations Declaration on the Rights of Indigenous Peoples federal law and requires that all other laws in Canada be made to comply with the law .

In 2020, the Member of Parliament for Pitt Meadows - Maple Ridge threw his support behind the future leader of the Conservative Party of Canada, Erin O'Toole.  Upon O'Toole's win, Dalton claimed, "I was pleased he won. I felt he was the strongest in a very strong field," going on to further add that he [O'Toole] is "a unifier" for the Party.

Personal life
He served in the Canadian Armed Forces Reserves and is a member of the Royal Canadian Legion.

Dalton has served his community in previous years as an elder of the Maple Ridge Community Church.

Dalton is of Cree-Metis Indigenous heritage and has touted this lineage.

Electoral record

Federal

Provincial

See also
British Columbia Liberal Party

References

External links
http://www.reelyou.ca/bc-liberals-marc-dalton-reelyou.html 
Marc Dalton, MLA for Maple Ridge-Mission
Official Biography, Legislative Assembly of British Columbia
Experience the Fraser

1960 births
British Columbia Liberal Party MLAs
Canadian Mennonites
Canadian schoolteachers
Conservative Party of Canada MPs
Indigenous Members of the House of Commons of Canada
Living people
Members of the House of Commons of Canada from British Columbia
Métis politicians
People from Maple Ridge, British Columbia
Simon Fraser University alumni